Thoosidae is a family of sponges belonging to the order Tetractinellida.

Genera:
 Alectona Carter, 1879
 Delectona Laubenfels, 1936
 Neamphius Laubenfels, 1953
 Thoosa Hancock, 1849

References

Sponge families